Sterling Clack Robertson (1785–1842) was an empresario from Tennessee, during Mexican Texas. He introduced 600 families into Robertson's Colony. Robertson was also an elected delegate to the Washington-on-the-Brazos convention, signing both the Texas Declaration of Independence and the Constitution of the Republic of Texas. He became a senator during the first two sessions of the Congress of the Republic of Texas.

Early life in Tennessee
Sterling Clack Robertson was born one of five children on October 2, 1785, into a wealthy and influential slave-holding family in Nashville, Tennessee. Robertson received a private education from Judge John McNairy by request through Elijah Robertson's will and through his family connections. His father was Captain Elijah Robertson,  who left Brunswick County, Virginia, in the 18th century to join family members and other early white settlers in Tennessee. Sterling's mother was Sarah Maclin Robertson. His paternal uncle James Robertson was an explorer known as the Father of Tennessee. His descendants were accomplished persons. Son Elijah Sterling Clack Robertson  became a Colonel in the Republic of Texas militia, and built a plantation in Salado, Texas. Robertson's great-great-granddaughter was author Liz Carpenter, who was a press spokesperson for both President Lyndon B. Johnson and later for Ladybird Johnson. He was known to be a hot-tempered ladies man who dressed in expensive tailored clothes. As a youth, Robertson was convicted of manslaughter of one of his cousins  in Tennessee, but did not serve his five-month sentence until  April 6 to September 1, 1832.

Robertson's colony
Under Mexican Texas, Robertson received an empresario contract to settle 800 families in Texas.

Texas Rangers and public service
In 1835, empresario Robertson formed his own rangers company to deal with Indian depredations at Robertson's Colony. Robertson was a delegate to the convention at Washington-on-the-Brazos. He signed both the Texas Declaration of Independence and the Constitution of the Republic of Texas. He was also a Senator at the first two sessions of the Congress of the Republic of Texas.

Personal life and death
According to his descendants, Robertson never married. However, he sired two sons by two different women. In addition to Elijah Sterling Clack Robertson with Frances King, he also fathered James Maclin Robertson with Rachael Smith. On December 18, 1837, Republic of Texas Senator Robertson got legislation passed that acknowledged both sons as his legitimate issue,  and legally entitled to inherit his estate. The legislation was signed into law by Republic President Sam Houston:

Sterling Clack Robertson died of pneumonia in Robertson County on March 4, 1842. His remains were removed to Austin and reinterred in the Texas State Cemetery on December 29, 1935.

See also
Felix Robertson

Notes

References

Republic of Texas Senators
1st Congress of the Republic of Texas
1785 births
1842 deaths
People of Mexican Texas
People from Nashville, Tennessee
Burials at Texas State Cemetery
Deaths from pneumonia in Texas
Signers of the Texas Declaration of Independence
American emigrants to Mexico